Samzhubzê District (also spelled Sangzhuzi District, Samdruptse District) is a district in the Tibet Autonomous Region of the China, and the administrative center of the prefecture-level city of Shigatse (Tibetan Pinyin: Xigazê). Prior to 2014 it was known as the county-level city of Shigatse. It was the ancient capital of Ü-Tsang province and is the second largest city in Tibet with an estimated population of 117,000 in 2013.

History 
In the 17th century, the city and the dzong was called Samdrubtsé (one of the transliterations of the current name). It was the capital of the Tsang.

In the 19th century, the "Tashi" or Panchen Lama had temporal power over Tashilhunpo Monastery and three small districts, though not over the town of Shigatse itself, which was administered by two Dzongpön (Prefects) appointed from Lhasa. Before military conflict between the PRC's People's Liberation Army and the then Tibetan Govt., the Tibetan territory was divided into 53 prefecture districts called Dzongs.

There were two Dzongpöns for every Dzong—a lama (Tse-dung) and a layman. They were entrusted with both civil and military powers and are equal in all respects, though subordinate to the generals and the Chinese Amban in military matters. However, there were only one or two Ambans representing the Qing (Manchu) Chinese emperor residing in Lhasa, directing a little garrison, and their power installed since 1728, progressively declined to end-up as observer at the eve of their expulsion in 1912 by the 13th Dalai Lama. In 1952, shortly after the PRC sent forces to the region, Shigatse had a population of perhaps 12,000 people, making it the second largest town in Tibet.

In 1959, Shigatse was made the administrative center of an eponymous special district of Tibet. In 1970 the special district was upgraded to a prefecture and the town designated a county. In 1986 the county became a county-level city, and when the prefecture was again upgraded to a prefecture-level city in 2014, the county-level city was redesignated a district and given the new name of Samzhubzê.

Geography and climate
Samzhubzê lies on flat terrain surrounded by high mountains, and the urban area is located just south of the Yarlung Zangbo River. The city's administrative area ranges in latitude from 29° 07' to 29° 09' N and in longitude from 88° 03' to 89° 08' E.

Samzhubzê has a monsoon-influenced, alpine version of a humid continental climate (Köppen Dwb), with frosty, very dry winters and warm, wet summers. Barely any precipitation falls from November to March, when the diurnal temperature variation can frequently exceed . Nearly two-thirds of the annual rainfall occurs in July and August alone. Sunshine is abundant year-round, totaling 3248 hours annually.

Administrative divisions 

Shigatse administers two subdistricts and ten townships.

Tashilhunpo 

Samzhubzê contains the huge Tashilhunpo Monastery, founded in 1447 by Gendun Drup, the First Dalai Lama. It is the traditional seat of the Panchen Lamas. Until the Chinese arrived in the 1950s, the "Tashi" or Panchen Lama had temporal power over three small districts, though not over Samzhubzê itself, which was administered by a dzongpön (general) appointed from Lhasa. In the 2nd week of the 5th lunar month (around June/July), Tashilhunpo Monastery is the scene of a 3-day festival and a huge thangka is displayed. 

The imposing castle, Samdrubtse Dzong or "Shigatse Dzong", was probably built in the 15th century. It looked something like a smaller version of the Potala Palace in Lhasa, and had turret-like fortifications at the ends and a central Red Palace. It used to be the seat of the kings of Ü-Tsang and the capital of the province of Ü-Tsang or Tsang.

The castle was totally dismantled, rock by rock, by hundreds of Tibetans at the instigation of the Chinese in 1961. Between 2005 and 2007, the building was reconstructed, financed by donations from Shanghai. Old photographs served as a basis for the reconstruction, which was executed in concrete. Afterwards, the exterior was to be wainscotted with natural stones. The dzong, which in the 17th century served as a model for the construction of the Potala Palace, is set to become a museum for Tibetan culture.

Nearby attractions include:
 Shalu Monastery
 Narthang, the first printing establishment in central Tibet
 Mount Everest

Infrastructure and transport 
 Samzhubzê is the hub of the road network between Lhasa, Nepal and western Tibet.
 Construction started in 2010 of the Lhasa–Shigatse Railway to Samzhubzê and was completed in 2014. Start operated on 15 August 2014. A further extension to the Nepalese border is planned.
The nearest railhead in India is the station of New Jalpaiguri, a suburb of Siliguri, West Bengal.
Shigatse Peace Airport began operations on 30 October 2010 and was Tibet's fifth commercial airport. It is located 43 kilometres from central Shigatse at Jangdam Township at an altitude of 3,782 metres. The airport is designed to handle up to 230,000 passengers annually by 2020.
 China National Highway 318

References

Citations

Sources 
 Das, Sarat Chandra. 1902. Lhasa and Central Tibet. Reprint: Mehra Offset Press, Delhi. 1988. 
 Dorje, Gyurme. 1999. Footprint Tibet Handbook. 2nd Edition. Bath, England. . Also published in Chicago, U.S.A. .
 Dowman, Keith. 1988. The Power-Places of Central Tibet: The Pilgrim's Guide, p. 59. Routledge & Kegan Paul. London.  (ppk).
 Richardson, Hugh E (1984). Tibet and its History. Second Edition, Revised and Updated. Shambhala Publications, Boston. .

External links 

 Fort of Shigatse in 1902, Perry–Castañeda Library Map Collection

 
Populated places in Tibet
Shigatse
Populated places in Shigatse